Jeffrey Hymanson (born March 11, 1954) is an American ice hockey player. He competed in the men's tournament at the 1976 Winter Olympics.

References

External links
 

1954 births
Living people
American men's ice hockey players
Olympic ice hockey players of the United States
Ice hockey players at the 1976 Winter Olympics
People from Anoka, Minnesota
Ice hockey players from Minnesota
Minnesota North Stars draft picks